Phillip Hagar Smith (April 29, 1905 in Lexington, Massachusetts – August 29, 1987 in Berkeley Heights, New Jersey) was an electrical engineer, who became famous for his invention of the Smith chart. Smith graduated from Tufts College in 1928 with a BS degree in electrical engineering. While working for Bell Telephone Laboratories, he invented his eponymous Smith chart (which was also invented independently in 1937 by Mizuhashi Tosaku).

When asked why he invented the chart, Smith explained, "From the time I could operate a slide rule, I've been interested in graphical representations of mathematical relationships." In 1969 he published the book Electronic Applications of the Smith Chart: In Waveguide, Circuit, and Component Analysis, a comprehensive work on the subject. He retired from Bell Labs in 1970. He was elected a fellow of the IRE in 1952.

Although best known for his Smith Chart, he made important contributions in a variety of fields, including radar, FM, and antennas (including use of the Luneburg lens).

The IEEE History Center conducted an interview with Smith in 1973, the edited transcript and audio clips from which are on the web.

Notes

External links
Philip H. Smith, an oral history conducted in 1973 by Frank A. Polkinghorn, IEEE History Center
 

1905 births
1987 deaths
Scientists at Bell Labs
Tufts University School of Engineering alumni
20th-century American engineers